Where the Road Runs Out is a 2014 South African-Dutch-Equatorial Guinean drama film directed by Rudolf Buitendach and starring Isaach de Bankolé.  It is the first feature film to be shot in Equatorial Guinea.

Plot

Cast
Isaach de Bankolé as George
Juliet Landau as Corina
Stelio Savante as Martin
Sizo Motsoko as Jimmy

Production
The film was shot in Equatorial Guinea, as well as in Durban and Rotterdam.

Release
The film made its worldwide premiere at the San Diego International Film Festival on 26 September 2014.

On 8 June 2016, it was announced that Netflix acquired the distribution rights of the film.

References

External links
 

English-language South African films
English-language Dutch films
2010s Spanish-language films
South African drama films
Dutch drama films
Films shot in KwaZulu-Natal
Films shot in Rotterdam
Films shot in the Netherlands
Spanish-language Netflix original films
2010s English-language films
Equatoguinean drama films
Films shot in Equatorial Guinea